Chennai Kadhal ( Chennai Love) is a 2006 Indian Tamil-language romantic comedy film written and directed by Vikraman. The film stars Bharath and Genelia. The film's score and soundtrack are composed by Joshua Sridhar. The film was released on 8 December 2006. It received negative reviews and became a flop.

Plot

Gautham, a college dropout and good-for-nothing guy, falls in love with Narmada, the daughter of a local don Sakthivel. She lives in a hostel after learning that her father is a criminal who now wants her to marry his partner Sardar's brother. So the two lovers elope to Mumbai, and they are soon tracked and separated. Finally, Gautham, along with his friends, fights against all odds to win back Narmada.

Cast

Soundtrack
Soundtrack was composed by Joshua Sridhar and lyrics were written by Pa. Vijay, Na. Muthukumar and Viveka.

"Enjoy Idhu" — Ranjith
"Angel Angel" — Karthik, Sunitha Sarathy
"Silusilukkum" — Naresh Iyer, Kalpana Raghavendar
"Thimre Thimire" — Sriram Parthasarathy, Sweta Mohan
"Salladai" — Karthik, Swetha Mohan

Critical reception
The film received negative reviews from critics. Indiaglitz wrote "Laudable performances, a racy screenplay and the light-hearted comic sequences make Chennai Kadhal a definite winner". Sify wrote "Director Vikraman has made a deliberate attempt to deviate from his usual formula and it has succeeded to a certain extent though the story, presentation and even dialogues are so predictable. The main problem lies with its script which has nothing new to offer and the love between the lead pair is so artificial has no life in it". Rediff wrote "The movie is director Vikraman's supposed attempt to make something different. It is surely not one of his usual slow paced dramas, but that alone is not enough to make it 'different,' by any standards. He has chosen a plot older than a heavily worn out doormat".

References

External links
 

2006 films
2000s Tamil-language films
Films directed by Vikraman
Indian romantic comedy films
Films scored by Joshua Sridhar
2006 romantic comedy films